Mineirão, officially Estádio Governador Magalhães Pinto (Governor Magalhães Pinto Stadium) is the largest football stadium in the state of Minas Gerais. It was established in 1965, and it is located in Belo Horizonte.

It served as a venue in the 2013 FIFA Confederations Cup and the 2014 FIFA World Cup. It also hosted some matches of the football tournament of the 2016 Summer Olympics. The stadium has a seating capacity of 61,846 spectators. The property of the state of Minas Gerais, it is used by Cruzeiro.

History

Background 
The project to construct the Mineirão predated the stadium's opening by more than 25 years. In the 1940s, a modest movement began, involving managers, entrepreneurs, athletes and journalists. The idea was to build a field in Belo Horizonte to that matched the evolution of Minas Gerais' football up to that point.

The top three teams in the state capital had their stadiums, but they were cramped and uncomfortable, and no longer supported the demand of fans. Stadium Otacílio Negrão de Lima (Alameda Stadium, at Francisco Sales Avenue), of América; Antônio Carlos Stadium (located on Olegário Maciel Avenue), of Atlético Mineiro; and Juscelino Kubitschek Stadium (located on Augusto de Lima Avenue), of Cruzeiro did not support more than 10,000 spectators. Atlético, the team with the wealthiest members in Belo Horizonte, planned to build a stadium for 30,000 people, after the winning the 1937 State Champions Cup. It nearly became a reality, but then they found a huge club debt, forcing the directors to allot and sell the properties that the club had in the neighborhood where the stadium would be built, Antônio Carlos Avenue, near the airport.

At the end of the 1940s, journalist Canor Simões Coelho achieved with CBD the inclusion of Belo Horizonte as one of the venues of 1950 FIFA World Cup. For this, the council would have to build a stadium at the height of the event. Official agreement was signed by mayor Otacílio Negrão de Lima and the president of the CBD, Rivadávia Correa Meyer. The modest club Sete de Setembro was in charge of commanding the works of the new field.

The construction of Independência Stadium was slow and it seemed that would not be completed in time for the World Cup. But with the intervention of the CBD and FIFA, the city of Belo Horizonte took charge of construction, and the stage was handed over in time for the match between Yugoslavia and Switzerland on June 25, 1950, even with improvisations. But soon the initial excitement for the new stadium was falling apart, since the 30,000 seats available did not meet the growing number of fans. Independência was uncomfortable for the audience, and did not offer good conditions for the press.

The early 1950s saw the first steps supporting the construction of a larger stadium in Belo Horizonte.  Under the leadership of Gil César Moreira de Abreu, a group of students from the School of Engineering of Universidade Federal de Minas Gerais (UFMG) proposed the construction of a University Stadium, to be located in the city's Pampulha region, where the university owned land. In 1956 the chairman of Federação Mineira de Futebol, Francisco de Castro Cortes proposed the construction of a Municipal Stadium on a location adjacent to the BR-040 highway, close to where BH Shopping mall stands today. The proposal asked for funds to be obtained through the sales of perpetual seating rights ('cadeiras cativas'). With the support of the President, former Minas Gerais Governor Juscelino Kubitschek, Cortes even arranged for engineers involved in the construction of Maracanã to come to Belo Horizonte and review the project.

At the time, Antonio Abrahão Caram was President of the Regional Sports Council (Conselho Regional de Desportos) in Minas Gerais, and became one of the strongest supporters of what was destined to become Mineirão. Abrahão Caram demonstrated impractical aspects of the project supported by Cortes, which was eventually abandoned in favor of a new project for the current stadium. The new project was prepared under the auspices of a team led by Benedicto Adami de Carvalho. In recognition of Abrahão Caram's role in proposing a feasible financial arrangement, selecting the venue, and assistance in drafting a State Assembly bill paving the way for the construction of Mineirão, in 1966 his name was officially designated to the avenue where the stadium is located, Avenida Antônio Abrahão Caram.

Once the design started to become a reality, then State Representative Jorge Carone Filho was assigned the mission of drafting the State Assembly bill that would help turn Mineirão a reality. The idea was to obtain funding through the State Lottery (Loteria Mineira) whose tickets would carry a 10% earmark toward a stadium building fund.  "Estádio Minas Gerais" was then created under State Bill 1947 dated August 12, 1959, which was signed into Law by Governor José Francisco Bias Fortes. The law also provided for the creation of AEMG, an administrative tasked with managing the finished stadium. AEMG would later become ADEMG (Administração de Estádios do Estado de Minas Gerais).

Modifications to the original University Stadium were left to architects Eduardo Mendes Guimarães and Gaspar Garreto, which the goal of upgrading it from a 30,000 visitors venue into a new "giant" stadium capable of accommodating up to 100,000 visitors. The chosen site was located in the Pampulha region, in land owned by UFMG, whose President Pedro Paulo Penido was favorable to the project while expecting construction of Mineirão at the site of UFMG's new campus would attract an influx of people into this sparsely populated area. With the approval of President Kubitschek's Education Minister Clóvis Salgado, an agreement between UFMG and AEMG was signed on February 25, 1960, when the Brazilian federal government and the Federal University of Minas Gerais gave Minas Gerais land in the neighborhood of Pampulha, Belo Horizonte, for the construction of the stadium.

Construction
When they began work on the stadium in 1959, engineers and workers were not sure it would be completed. Cesar Gil, the construction manager, faced financial crises, but knew how to use politics in favor of Mineirão. Despite the extreme control of spending, the works were facing, at each step, the depletion of resources. The initial loan of ₢$100 million evaporated in implementing the first service of its foundation. For a year and a half, the contract followed a slow pace, working with limited equipment and staffing minimum. While one group acted politically to change laws that enable the acquisition of resources and also convince the Governor Magalhães Pinto fund the construction, AEMG trying to adapt to the fragile financial situation.

Mineirão was planned by Eduardo Mendes Guimarães Júnior and Caspar Garreto, both architects. The structural project was undertaken by engineer Arthur Eugênio Jermann. The construction workmanship was directed by engineer Gil Cesar Moreira de Abreu. From 1963 to the date of its inauguration on September 5, 1965, approximately five thousand people were involved in the construction.

The new stadium was raised to the emblem for the national engineering by offering countless examples of evolution in construction. The team of engineers Mineirão went to the extreme in the details. Passed the Maracanã by a real x-ray, finding weaknesses that should not be repeated in the Mineirão field. In 1964, Gil Caesar sought in Tokyo, where arenas were built for Olympics, news about this type of work. Traders noted features and engineering innovations. Worried by the quality of the grass: tags and other minutiae.

The big question that engineers and workers were tested for their ability to perform a superstructure – a false ellipse, measuring the major axis of 275 meters and the lowest 217 meters – using conventional equipment. To evaluate and eliminate uncertainties, a "mini-Mineirão" was designed, called the experimental sector 15, where a link bleachers and roof would be subjected to all sorts of evidence. Concrete plants, conveyors, degrees, loaders and shuttle were tested. The complexity of the work required iron bars into lengths that the industry was unable to attend. The solution came in the actual construction site, where engineers and workers solder used to promote the extension of the bars.

With available resources could be hiring more people, but bumped into AEMG lack of qualified staff. Made a public bidding for the supply of labor, it was found to be unenforceable, because the price charged – 15 million Cruzeiros – was infinitely high box for the administration of the new field. It was proved in the future, the amount requested by the companies would build a Mineirão and a half. On accountability, the "Gigante da Pampulha" (Pampulha Giant) consumed a total of 10 million dollars. Because of the lack of skilled labor available, AEMG promoted the training of masons, carpenters, ship owners and other professionals. Whole classes were formed, and hundreds of workers have gained qualifications to perform special functions. At this stage, the administration managed to gather the required number needed to play and work at a fast pace. Between August 1964 and July 1965, the building jumped from one sector (the experiment) to offer the country's most modern stadium.

To speed construction and shorten the drama of the budget, Gil Caesar launched the operation 24 hours a day, divided into three shifts three thousand workers hired. The service did not stop a single minute. Acaiaca the top of the building in downtown Belo Horizonte, saw a huge flash of light coming from the sides of the future Mineirão. The administration began to reward teams for production and creativity, encouraging competition among the various sectors of the construction. The idea of "local little game" was so successful that many fronts have been completed well before the deadline. The full-time process allowed the stadium to be handed to the population in eight months. Even in the hectic pace and pressure, only one worker died during the entire construction of the arena.

The festivities marking the opening of the stadium included parachute jumpers, music, and an inaugural football match. The events were attended by 73,201 people. The inaugural match at Mineirão Stadium was played by the Minas Gerais state team and the Argentinian team, River Plate.

Important matches

The record attendance of the stadium was 132,834 people in 1997 in Campeonato Mineiro final match between Cruzeiro and Villa Nova. The paying attendance was 74,857, and there were 56,618 women and children who entered for free. For safety reasons, the capacity of Mineirão has been reduced for the majority of its 40-year history. In 2004, by imposition of FIFA, the capacity of the stadium was reduced to 72,000 people.

Since the stadium opening, the three most important teams in Belo Horizonte have hosted their matches in Mineirão: Cruzeiro (always), Atlético Mineiro and América. Mineirão has hosted also at least one match of the Brazil national team in every FIFA World Cup qualifications, and matches of the 2013 FIFA Confederations Cup, the 2014 FIFA World Cup and men/women football matches of Olympic Games 2016.

Important matches and trophies won by local teams on Mineirão's pitch include:
First match: Friendly – September 5, 1965 – Minas Gerais state team 1–0 River Plate. Attendance: 73,201.
First international match: Friendly – September 7, 1965 – Brazil 3–0 Uruguay (Brazil was represented by Palmeiras.)
First Clássico Mineiro: Campeonato Mineiro – October 24, 1965 – Cruzeiro 1–0 Atlético Mineiro
First national final in Minas Gerais: 1966 Taça Brasil – November 30, 1966 – Cruzeiro 6–2 Santos 	
First international final in Minas Gerais: 1976 Copa Libertadores – July 21, 1976 – Cruzeiro 4–1 River Plate
Intercontinental Cup: December 21, 1976 – Cruzeiro 0–0 Bayern Munich
Supercopa Libertadores: November 20, 1991 – Cruzeiro 3–0 River Plate
Copa do Brasil – 1993, 2000, 2003, 2017 (Cruzeiro), 2014 (Atlético Mineiro)
Copa Libertadores – 1997 (Cruzeiro), 2013 (Atlético Mineiro)
Copa CONMEBOL – 1997 (Atlético)
Recopa Sudamericana – 2014 (Atlético Mineiro)
Mineirazo (Agony of Mineirão): 2014 FIFA World Cup – July 8, 2014 – Germany 7–1 Brazil

The stadium's top scorer is Reinaldo, who played for Atlético from 1973 to 1984 and swung the nets 144 times. On the other hand, Cruzeiro's Tostão played from 1965 to 1972, scored 143 goals and had the best yearly average (17 goals).

Historical goals scored in Mineirão 
First goal: Buglê, from Minas Gerais state team on September 5, 1965
1000th: Lola, from Atlético Mineiro, on April 6, 1968
5000th: Paulinho, from Villa Nova, on March 10, 1985
Miroslav Klose's 16 FIFA World Cup goal (record), on July 8, 2014
Germany national team's 2000th goal, on July 8, 2014

2013 FIFA Confederations Cup

2014 FIFA World Cup

2016 Summer Olympics – Women's Football

2016 Summer Olympics – Men's Football

2019 Copa América

Concerts

Mineirão has been the venue to music events since its opening date:

 Kiss – Creatures of the Night Tour, June 23, 1983
 Menudo – 1985
 Diante do Trono – Preciso de Ti, July 15, 2001 (biggest audience ever at the stadium, featuring more than 210,000 people)
 RBD – September 30, 2006
 Elton John – 40th Anniversary of the Rocket Man, March 9, 2013
 Pop Rock Brasil Festival – 2001, 2005–07 (2006 edition featured The Rasmus, New Order and Black Eyed Peas)
 Axé Brasil Festival – 2005–2010, 2013
 Paul McCartney – Out There! Tour, May 4, 2013 (the tour kick off)
 Beyoncé – The Mrs. Carter Show World Tour, September 11, 2013
 Pearl Jam – Pearl Jam 2015 Latin America Tour, November 20, 2015
 Paul McCartney – One on One Tour, October 17, 2017
 Metallica – May 12, 2022
 Guns N' Roses – Guns N' Roses 2020 Tour, September 13, 2022

After the reform, the outside "patio" also became a viable location for concerts.
 Black Sabbath – Black Sabbath Reunion Tour, October 15, 2013
 Festival Planeta Brasil (Guns N' Roses, Cypress Hill, Slightly Stoopid, Criolo, Raimundos, Roberto Frejat and Natiruts) – March 22, 2014
 Circuito Banco do Brasil 2014 (Linkin Park, Titãs, Nação Zumbi, Panic! at the Disco) – October 14, 2014
 Foo Fighters – Sonic Highways World Tour, January 28, 2015
 Los Hermanos – October 23, 2015
 Maroon 5 – Maroon V Tour – March 11, 2016
 Iron Maiden – The Book of Souls World Tour, March 19, 2016
 BH Dance Festival (featuring Alesso and Afrojack)  – April 21, 2016
 Ed Sheeran – ÷ Tour, May 30, 2017 
 Aerosmith – Aero-Vederci Baby! Tour, September 18, 2017
 John Mayer – The Search for Everything World Tour – October 20, 2017

 Demi Lovato – Holy Fvck Tour – September 2, 2022

References

Bibliography

ADEMG – Administração dos Estádios de Minas Gerais (Administration of the stadiums of Minas Gerais)
http://www.ademg.mg.gov.br/index.php?option=com_content&view=article&id=76&Itemid=83
Terra Esportes
http://bdfbrasilespecial.blogspot.com/2006/10/1965-o-palmeiras-brasil.html
https://web.archive.org/web/20091018174321/http://www.benny75.com/hotsite/taca66/primeiro.html
Bola na Area

External links/images

Stadium Guide Article
FIFA Profile

Sports venues completed in 1965
Football venues in Minas Gerais
Sports venues in Belo Horizonte
Clube Atlético Mineiro
Cruzeiro Esporte Clube
Venues of the 2016 Summer Olympics
Olympic football venues
2014 FIFA World Cup stadiums
Gerkan, Marg and Partners buildings
2013 FIFA Confederations Cup stadiums
Football in Belo Horizonte